Saint-Bonnet-Tronçais is a commune in the Allier department in Auvergne-Rhône-Alpes in central France, within the borders of the national Forest of Tronçais.

Population

See also
Communes of the Allier department

References

Communes of Allier
Allier communes articles needing translation from French Wikipedia